Kropfer can refer to either of two species of fish from Switzerland in the genus Coregonus:

Coregonus alpinus, from Lake Thun
Coregonus restrictus, which is probably extinct